The women's 100 metres event at the 2022 African Championships in Athletics was held on 8 and 9 June in Port Louis, Mauritius.

Medalists

Results

Heats
Held on 8 June

Qualification: First 3 of each heat (Q) and the next 6 fastest (q) qualified for the semifinals.

Wind:Heat 1: +1.5 m/s, Heat 2: -0.3 m/s, Heat 3: +1.1 m/s, Heat 4: -0.5 m/s, Heat 5: +0.5 m/s, Heat 6: +2.2 m/s, Heat 7: +1.9 m/s

Semifinals
Held on 8 June

Qualification: First 2 of each semifinal (Q) and the next 2 fastest (q) qualified for the final.

Wind:Heat 1: +0.1 m/s, Heat 2: +3.2 m/s, Heat 3: +1.5 m/s

Final
Held on 9 June

Wind: +4.8 m/s

References

2022 African Championships in Athletics
100 metres at the African Championships in Athletics